PX-3 (also known as APP-CHMINACA) is an indazole-based synthetic cannabinoid. It is a potent agonist of the CB1 receptor with a binding affinity of Ki = 47.6 nM and was originally developed by Pfizer in 2009 as an analgesic medication.

The acronym 'APP' signifies the 'amino', 'phenyl' and 'propanone' elements of the structure. Three related compounds, PX-1 (5F-APP-PICA, SRF-30), PX-2 (5F-APP-PINACA, FU-PX) and APP-FUBINACA were reported by the EMCDDA in late 2014.

Legality
Sweden's public health agency suggested to classify APP-CHMINACA as hazardous substance on June 1, 2015.

See also 

 5F-AB-PINACA
 5F-ADB
 5F-AMB
 5F-APINACA
 AB-FUBINACA
 AB-CHFUPYCA
 AB-CHMINACA
 AB-PINACA
 ADB-CHMINACA
 ADB-FUBINACA
 ADB-PINACA
 ADBICA
 APICA
 APINACA
 MDMB-CHMICA
 PX-1
 PX-2

References 

Cannabinoids
Designer drugs
Indazolecarboxamides